Punjab Prison Staff Training College (PPSTC), Sahiwal is a provincial Government's training college for prison officers in Punjab, Pakistan. The college operates under general command and control of the  Government of the Punjab, Home Department, Lahore. It is situated near Central Jail Sahiwal and High Security Prison, Sahiwal.

See also
 Government of Pakistan
 Punjab Prisons (Pakistan)
 National Police Academy of Pakistan
 National Academy for Prisons Administration
 Elite Police Training School
 Police College Sihala
 Central Jail Faisalabad
 Central Jail Lahore
 Central Jail Mianwali
 Prison Officer
 Central Jail Rawalpindi
 District Jail Rawalpindi

References

Government agencies of Punjab, Pakistan
Law enforcement agencies of Pakistan
Law enforcement in Pakistan
Prison-related organizations
Public universities and colleges in Punjab, Pakistan